William Cornish may refer to:
William Cornish (legal scholar) (1937–2022), Australian legal scholar and academic
William Robert Cornish (1828–1896), British physician
William R. Cornish (1890–1969), member of the Legislative Assembly of Alberta
William Cornysh, also spelt Cornish (1465–1523), English composer and dramatist
Willie Cornish (1875–1942), American jazz musician
William Crocker Cornish, co-founder of Cornish and Bruce, a railway contracting company in Victoria, Australia